P-box may refer to: 

 permutation box 
 probability box
 privacy box, used by the Winston Smith Project#P-Box project
 P. Box (band)